Al-Mustaqbal, The Future, was a Palestinian electoral list headed by Marwan Barghouti and registered in December 2005 for January 2006 elections for the Palestinian Legislative Council.

Formation
Barghouti announced that he had formed the new political party on December 14, 2005. Al-Mustaqbal was mainly composed of members of Fatah's "Young Guard", who had repeatedly expressed frustration with the entrenched corruption in the party.

The split followed Barghouti's earlier refusal of Mahmoud Abbas' offer to be second on the Fatah party's parliamentary list, behind Palestinian Prime Minister Ahmed Qurei.  In the Fatah primaries, held a few weeks earlier, Barghouti won first place convincingly, but Abbas initially refused to honor this result.  In response, Barghouti's supporters threatened to break away from Fatah.  Abbas attempted a last-minute compromise allowing Barghouti to top the Fatah list, but this was not sufficient and Barghouti broke away anyway.  Palestinian security minister Mohammed Dahlan as well as a number of other senior members of Fatah joined Al-Mustaqbal.

Reactions to the news were split. Some suggested that the move could be a positive step towards peace, as Barghouti's new party could help reform major problems in Palestinian government. Others  raised concern that it could wind up splitting the Fatah vote, inadvertently helping Hamas. Barghouti's supporters argued that al-Mustaqbal would split the votes of both parties, both from disenchanted Fatah members as well as moderate Hamas voters who did not agree with Hamas' political goals, but rather its social work and hard position on corruption.

Some observers have hypothesized that the formation of Mustaqbal was primarily a negotiating tactic to get members of the young guard into higher positions of power within Fatah and its electoral list. A variant theory was that after the elections, Mustaqbal would either be partially re-incorporated into Fatah, or would function as part of a parliamentary coalition with it in opposition to Hamas and other political rivals.

Re-Consolidation
On December 28, 2005, it was announced that Fatah was going to submit a new, unified list for the January primaries, consisting of members from both Fatah's old guard and Al-Mustaqbal. Barghouti was given the top slot on the list. Al-Mustaqbal spokesmen claimed that the decision to re-join Fatah was motivated out a desire to prevent Hamas from gaining electoral strength. Shortly after the announcement, Barghouti began campaigning for Fatah from his jail cell, apologizing to young Fatah members for the party's past mistakes, particularly relating to corruption. Despite the merger news, some analysts believe that the division in the party is far from resolved, and that  an increase in rivalries and inter-party factionalism will occur after the elections. There is a definite possibility that such a development could quickly turn violent, as both groups exert control over various large militias.

Mustaqbal post-elections
In the wake of Fatah's defeat in the elections, Mustaqbal's early momentum seems to have been largely stalled, and it is unclear what role, if any, it will play as an independent, or partially autonomous faction within Fatah or Palestinian government in the future. As of several months after its formation, the party had yet to publicly disclose its platform or positions, leaving many questions about its policies, particularly regarding territorial demands and violence against Israel, unanswered. Some analysts have suggested that Mustaqbal's ultimate significance lies in the fact that it firmly demonstrated just how wide the existing gap between the old and young generations of Fatah activists is, and that it wound up splitting the Fatah vote in many districts when discontented Mustaqbal members ran independent of the "re-integrated" Fatah list. In a very real sense, Mustaqbal's existence contributed to Hamas' victory in the 2006 Palestinian elections.

See also
List of political parties in the Palestinian National Authority

References

External links
Fatah split ahead of Palestinian poll (Euronews)
Fatah splits before key election (BBC)
Main Palestinian Faction Splits Sharply Ahead of Election (The New York Times)

Defunct Palestinian political parties